South Junior High School may refer to:
 South Junior High School (Anaheim, California)
 South Junior High School (Quincy, Massachusetts), listed on the National Register of Historic Places
 South Junior High School (Niagara Falls, New York), listed on the National Register
 South Junior High School (Grand Forks, North Dakota), listed on the National Register